The fixture list for the 2019 season was issued on 25 November 2018.  The regular season comprises 22 rounds with each of the eleven teams having 20 fixtures and 2 bye rounds.

All times are UK local time (UTC or UTC+1) on the relevant dates.

Round 1

Round 2

Round 3

Round 4

Round 5

Round 6

Round 7

Round 8

Round 9

Round 10

Round 11

Round 12

Round 13

Round 14

Round 15

Round 16

Round 17

Round 18

Round 19

Round 20

Round 21

Round 22

Elimination and qualifying finals

Semi-finals

Preliminary final

Play-off final

References

2019 in English rugby league
RFL League 1 results
RFL League 1